Li Chi-an (born 7 July 1945) is a North Korean football striker who played for North Korea in the 1966 FIFA World Cup. He also played for 2.8 Sports Team.

References

1945 births
North Korean footballers
North Korea international footballers
Association football forwards
1966 FIFA World Cup players
Living people